Vicente Rodrigo Paciello (born 28 February 1986 in Concepción, Paraguay) is a Paraguayan footballer currently playing for Sportivo San Lorenzo of the División Intermedia in Paraguay.

Teams
  Fernando de la Mora 2006-2007
  12 de Octubre 2008
  Deportes Iquique 2009
  Independiente de Campo Grande 2010
  2 de Mayo 2011
  Sportivo San Lorenzo 2012–present

References

External links
 

1986 births
Living people
Paraguayan footballers
Paraguayan expatriate footballers
Club Sportivo San Lorenzo footballers
Independiente F.B.C. footballers
2 de Mayo footballers
12 de Octubre Football Club players
Deportes Iquique footballers
Primera B de Chile players
Expatriate footballers in Chile
Association football forwards